Kohali is the name of two places:

Kohali (Faisalabad District)
Kohali (Jhelum District)